Nereina is a genus of brackish water and freshwater snails with an operculum, aquatic gastropod mollusks in the subfamily Neritininae of the family Neritidae, the nerites.

Species
 Nereina afra (G. B. Sowerby I, 1836)
 Nereina cresswelli Eichhorst, 2016
 Nereina haemastoma (Martens, 1878)
 Nereina punctulata (Lamarck, 1816)
Species brought into synonymy
 Nereina lacustris de Cristofori & Jan, 1832: synonym of Nereina punctulata (Lamarck, 1816)

References

 Eichhorst T.E. (2016). Neritidae of the world. Volume 1. Harxheim: Conchbooks. 695 pp.

External links
 

Neritidae